There have been several nicknames for the City of Cleveland throughout its history. These include:

 "The 216" – Referring to the local area code.
 "America's North Coast" or "The North Coast" – Referring to the city's geographic position on the Lake Erie shore.
 "Believeland" – Originated in 2007 and culminated in the 2016 NBA Finals between the Cleveland Cavaliers and the Golden State Warriors.
 "The Best Location in the Nation" – Nickname commonly used for Cleveland during the 1950s, also referring to the city's geographic position.
 "C-town" or "C-land" – Used by many performing artists and locals to denote Cleveland.
 "City of Champions" – Referring to Cleveland's golden age of sports victories in the 1940s and 1950s.
 "City of Light"
 "The CLE" or simply "CLE" – From the IATA code for Cleveland Hopkins International Airport.
 "The Cleve" – Nickname used in TV show 30 Rock.
 "The Forest City" – Cleveland's oldest nickname. Introduced in the early 19th century, it refers to the forested nature of the city.
 "The Land" – A term originating in Cleveland-made hip-hop music in the 1990s, and became popular in the national media in the mid-2010s.
 "Metropolis of the Western Reserve" – A historical nickname for Cleveland, referring to the historical Connecticut Western Reserve.
 "The Mistake on the Lake" – A pejorative term for the city, originating from the late 1960s.
 "The New American City"
 "Prodigy of the Western Reserve" – A nickname for Cleveland coined by local journalist George E. Condon, also referring to the Connecticut Western Reserve.
 "The Rock and Roll Capital of the World" – Originated in the early 1970s.  Refers to Cleveland's association with rock and roll music.  Today, Cleveland is home of the Rock and Roll Hall of Fame.
 "Sixth City" – An early 20th century nickname due to Cleveland being the sixth largest city in the nation at the time.

See also
 List of city nicknames in Ohio
 Lists of nicknames – nickname list articles on Wikipedia

References

Cleveland
Culture of Cleveland
Nicknames for Cleveland
Names of places in the United States